Hamish Angus McLachlan (born 28 August 1975) is an Australian sports broadcaster and host with Seven Sport.

Since he joined the Seven Network in January 2008, he has been a host/presenter/reporter at multiple events, including being a part of every Australian Open tennis tournament until 2018 and hosting AFL Game Day since its beginning through to this day. McLachlan was the host for the network's Olympics and Commonwealth Games, a position previously held by the likes of Sandy Roberts and Matt White.

Early career 
McLachlan began working in sports management in 1998, where he worked with Elite Sports Properties (ESP). As general manager of the Events and Entertainment Division, he was involved in a number of different sporting events, including the 2000 Summer Olympics, the 2002 Winter Olympics, the 2002 FIFA World Cup, and the 2002 Commonwealth Games.

In 2004, McLachlan became a director of the AFL Hall of Fame and Sensation exhibition in Melbourne which was placed into administration two months after opening due to severe debt. He had previously co-founded Spyglass Management, which was awarded the licence to operate the Hall of Fame. In November 2004, the Federal Court of Australia described Spyglass Management as "hopelessly insolvent", with "many creditors, whose debts in aggregate exceed $26 million".

Media career 
In 2008, McLachlan joined the Seven Network becoming co-host of AFL Game Day, a new Australian Rules Football review panel television program on Sunday mornings. He also took up a role at Triple M radio as a match-day commentator, calling Saturday-night and Sunday-afternoon AFL matches. He also co-hosted the 2009 and 2011 Brownlow Medal 'Blue Carpet' ceremonies with Seven News presenter, Rebecca Maddern, and fellow Seven Sport presenter, Rachel Finch, respectively.

McLachlan was a court interviewer at the 2008 Australian Open (his first role at the Seven Network), an event he has been a part of every year since, becoming a host a few years later (afternoons) and then prime-time host from 2015 (taking over from Johanna Griggs who herself replaced Matt White a few years earlier).

McLachlan hosts AFL Game Day on Sunday mornings (a program he has hosted since its inception in 2008), which reviews and analyses the weekend's AFL round.

The same year, he called the Spring Racing Carnival for Triple M.

Outside of Australian rules football and horse racing, McLachlan is involved in calling polo matches. He also owns Ten Goals, a small media and production described as specialising in "sports broadcasting, commentary, hosting and multimedia presentations".

In 2012, McLachlan became part of the Seven Network's AFL team, initially as co-commentator of Saturday afternoon matches with Basil Zempilas. In 2015, he began calling Sunday afternoon matches with Dennis Cometti (and later Brian Taylor), only for matches played in Melbourne (as AFL Game Day, which he hosts earlier in the day, is produced at Seven's Docklands studios). McLachlan eventually went on to also host the network's Friday night telecasts, with a pre-game and post game analysis alongside expert commentators. In 2021, McLachlan moved to co-commentating Saturday night matches alongside Luke Darcy and Thursday night matches with Jason Bennett from 2022.

In 2016, McLachlan created controversy and received criticism following an on-air incident when he was pushed away by fill-in weather presenter and Miss Universe Australia, Monika Radulovic, as a result of him flirting and embracing with her during a live cross to the Magic Millions horse racing event. He later apologised to Radulovic and viewers on air.

In 2016, Hamish joined the Seven Network's Olympics coverage for the first time (having not been part of Beijing 2008), as prime-time host at Rio 2016.

He has written for the Herald Sun newspaper in Melbourne.

In 2018, McLachlan is currently co-host sports entertainment series Australian Spartan.

In February 2018, he hosted the Seven Network's prime-time coverage of the Pyeongchang Winter Olympics.

In April 2018, McLachlan hosted the network's prime-time Gold Coast Commonwealth Games coverage, Seven's biggest event since the Beijing 2008 Olympics, averaging as high as over 2.1 million Australian viewers.

McLachlan also hosted the prime-time coverage of the delayed 2020 Tokyo Olympics, the 2022 Beijing Winter Olympics and the 2022 Birmingham Commonwealth Games.

Personal life 
McLachlan is originally from North Adelaide, South Australia, and attended St Peter's College and the University of Adelaide, where he graduated with a degree in commerce. His older brother Gillon McLachlan is Chief Executive Officer of the AFL.

References

External links

1975 births
Australian rules football commentators
Australian television presenters
Living people
People educated at St Peter's College, Adelaide
People from Adelaide
University of Adelaide alumni